Llanfwrog is a village in Anglesey, in north-west Wales. The village lies near the coast about a mile east of Beach Gribin.

According to tradition, it was founded by Saint Mwrog. In the Welsh language Llanfwrog translates as the place/church of St. Mwrog. The only other place that is associated with the name of a Saint Mwrog is Llanfwrog, Denbighshire. In the Middle Ages Llanfwrog parish lay in the commote Talybolion in the Hundred of Cemaes. The church belonged to the rectory of the parish of Llan by the eighteenth century.

References

Villages in Anglesey